Taghenkoh District is a district (bakhsh) in Firuzeh County, Razavi Khorasan province, Iran. At the 2006 census, its population was 22,562, in 5,662 families.  The district has one city: Hemmatabad. The district has two rural districts (dehestan): Taghenkoh-e Jonubi Rural District and Taghenkoh-e Shomali Rural District.

References 

Districts of Razavi Khorasan Province
Firuzeh County